Byrd High School may refer to:

 C. E. Byrd High School, Shreveport, Louisiana
 Douglas Byrd High School, Fayetteville, North Carolina
 Robert C. Byrd High School, Clarksburg, West Virginia
 William Byrd High School, Roanoke County, Virginia

See also
 William Byrd High School Historic District
 L. C. Bird High School